Tavakolabad, Mirjaveh is a village in Corrin Rural District, in the Mirjaveh of Zahedan County, Sistan and Baluchestan Province, Iran. At the 2006 census, its population was 351, in 65 families.

References 

Populated places in Zahedan County